Kurdish cuisine ( or Xwarina Kurdî) consists of a wide variety of foods prepared by the Kurdish people. There are cultural similarities of Kurds and their immediate neighbours in Iran, Iraq, Turkey, Syria, and Armenia. Kurdish food is typical of western Asian cuisine.

Culinary customs 
The Kurdish diet includes a wide variety of fruits and vegetables. Lamb and chicken are the primary meats. Breakfast is typically flat bread, cheese, honey, sheep or cow yogurt, and a glass of black tea. For lunch, lamb and vegetables are simmered in a tomato sauce to make a stew usually served with rice and savory dishes are usually served with rice or flat bread (Naan). Kurdistan has a climate and soil suited to grapes, pomegranates, figs, and walnuts. Kurdish honey has a clear light taste and is often sold with the honeycomb. Kurdistan also produces dairy products from sheep and cow milk. Kurds make many types of kofta and kubba, dumplings filled with meat.

Kurdish cuisine makes abundant use of fresh herbs and spices.

Sweetened black tea is a very common drink, along with bitter strong coffee. Another favourite Kurdish drink is "mastow" (Sorani) or "Ava Mast", which is yogurt and salt mixed with water. The fermented version of this is called Do (Doogh). Both beverages are often served with the addition of dill, mint, pennyroyal or seeds from the Pistacia kurdica tree.

Staples of Kurdish cuisine are berbesel, biryani, dokliw, kellane, kullerenaske, kutilk, parêv tobouli, kuki (meat or vegetable pies), birinç (white rice alone or with meat or vegetables and herbs), and a variety of salads, pastries, and drinks specific to different parts of Kurdistan. Other popular dishes are makluba, kofta, shifta, shilah/maraga, spinach with eggs, wheat & lentil soup, beet & meat soup, sweet turnip, cardamon cookies, burgul pilaf, mehîr, hûr û rûvî, pel (yaprakh), chichma this dish is common in Erbil (Hewlêr), tefti, niskene and nane niskan.

Sawarr, a traditional dish among Kurdish farmers, is made of wheat grain that is boiled, sun dried and pounded in a mortar (curn) to get rid of the husk. The wheat is then crushed in a mill (destarr). The resulting grain food can be boiled and served.

Tapsi is a dish of aubergines, green peppers, courgettes and potatoes in a slightly spicy tomato sauce. Tashreeb consists of layers of naan in a sauce of green pepper, tomato, onions and chillies.
A typical Kurdish breakfast consists of cheese, butter, olives, eggs, tomatoes, cucumbers, green peppers, reçel (jam/marmalade; a preserve of whole fruits) and honey usually consumed on top of kaymak. Sausage, baked goods and even soups can be taken as a morning meal in Kurdistan. Perhaps more so than traditional breads such as pide, a crusty white loaf is widely consumed. A common Kurdish speciality for breakfast is called menemen, which is prepared with roasted tomatoes, peppers, olive oil and eggs. Invariably, black tea is served at breakfast.

Dishes and foods

Dairy products 
In Kurdistan, yoghurt is called mast, and is considered the most popular fermented dairy product. It is produced from cow milk or a mixture of sheep and goat milk using the traditional method. Dairy products comprise a large portion of traditional Kurdish food.

Keşk known as Kashk is a fermented and strained sour yogurt that can be consumed on its own as a cheese, or used as an ingredient in soups.

Cheeses 
The Kurds produce many varieties of cheese, mostly from sheep's milk. Kurdish cheese has been traditionally prepared from raw milk and it is ripened in goat's skin bags.

  Pista
 Kars kasseri 
 Wan herbed cheese (Wan herbed cheese)
 Torak
 Salamura

Penîrê Kopê
Penîrê salk
Daleme

Soups and ash 

 Şorbeşîr
 Şorbe
 Şorba ser û pê 
 Mahluta
 Şorbe nisk (lentil soup)
 Gêrmiya Êrişte (thyme dumpling soup)
 Germîya sîr (winter rice soup)
Terkhina
Halimaw 
Milky rice 
Qaziane 
Dokliw 
Yogurt ash 
Sanga sir

Bread 
In Kurdistan, bread can be found in various forms. Their ingredients differ as well as their shapes, densities, and textures.

 Nanê Loş (Lavash)
 Nanê tarîganê (Rye Bread)
 Nanê tîr (Yufka)
 Nanê Tenûr
 Nanê Hewramî
 Nanê Kulêrê
 Kilorîk (Simit)
 Lahmacun
 Purgaç (Shepherd's Bread)

Kalane bread
Bersaq

Pilav and pasta 

 Biryani 
 Brinji sor
 Girar, Sawer
 Keşke

Pastries 

 Borakê Panêr (Cheese Borek)
 Lawzena
 Kurdish Borek (Kürt Böreği)
 Kahi silq
 Pelûl, Paloola
 Tirşyat]

Vegetarian dishes 

 Fasolya
 Kartolên Pîvazan (Kurdish Potato-Onion Sauté)

Vegetable dishes 

 Shlai kolaka 
 Tirş û pîvaz (Tirshoopiaz) 
 Lobiyên Çêkirî (Kurdish Stewed Beans)
 Bamî (Kurdish okra stew)

Kebabs 

 Urfa Kebap 
 Ciger şîş 
 Cergwez
 Biraşka şîşê

Egg dishes 

 Hêk ê bacanê sor (Eggs in tomato)

Meze and salads 

 Cacik (Jajeek, Tzatziki)
 Seleta Palpena (Purslane Salad)
 Seleta denka beqla
 Şilkena
 Seleta Şivana (Classic Kurdish Salad)
 Tirş û pivaz (Tirshoopiaz)

Stuffed vegetables 
Stuffed vegetables are widely known as Pelpêç (Sarma) or Pel (Dolma)  in Kurdish regions. It is slowly simmered and they fill the house with an irresistible scent of fresh herbs, aromatics, and tangy lemons.

 Pel (Dolma)
 Pelpêç  (Yaprak or Sarma)

Meat dishes 
As nomads and herders, lamb and chicken have been the main dishes of in Kurdish cuisine for centuries.

 Doghava
 Ecîn, Çîgê goşt or Kutilka Rihayê (Çiğ köfte)
 Kutilk
 Rihik (Kurdish beef)
 Givîşk (Kurdish rice and beef sausage)
 Biryani ya mirîşka (Kurdish chicken biryani)
 Kepari
 Teşrîba Mirşkê (Chicken with sumac)
 Helîma Ardan (Kurdish Roux)

Fish 

 Mazgouf

Desserts 

 Bastiq 
 Eşûran (Ashura)
 Fetîr 
 Helaw
 Hesîde
 Loqme or Bamik
 Luqmeqazi
 Paklawa
 Pirtik
 Qetmer
 Rewani
 Şilikî
 Şîrîna kûçe
 Xoşav
 Zerde

Non-alcoholic beverages 

 Dew 
 Mastaw
 Kurdish coffee (Qehweya Kezwanê or Kafêya Kurdî)
 Ava Sûsê
 Chai (Çay)
 Gulav (Rose Water)
 Lebzîne
 Ava Kişmîş (Raisin drink)

Holiday celebrations

During the festival of Newroz, Kurds enjoy picnics in the countryside, eating traditional food, often with dolma, and dancing the traditional Kurdish dance called Halperke.

Kurdish people also enjoy Eid food such as chicken, rice, dolma and biryani.

Related cuisines 

 Arab cuisine
 Armenian cuisine
 Assyrian cuisine
 Azerbaijani cuisine
 Balkan cuisine
 Caucasian cuisine
 Central Asian cuisine
 Cypriot cuisine
 Greek cuisine
 Iranian cuisine
 Levantine cuisine
 Mediterranean cuisine
 Mesopotamian cuisine
 Middle Eastern cuisine
 Ottoman cuisine
 Turkish cuisine
 Turkmen cuisine

See also 
 Kurdish coffee, a hot drink made from terebinth

References

Bibliography 

 Barzinji, Ala, Traditional Kurdish Food: An insight into Kurdish culinary heritage, 2015, .
 Sinjari, Emel, The Kurdish Cookbook, 2016, .
 Zebari, Chiman, My Life, My Food, My Kurdistan, 2015, .
 Nikolovski, Goce, Taste of Kurdish Cuisine: Part 1, 2016, .

External links 
 
 

 
Turkish cuisine
Iraqi cuisine
Syrian cuisine
Iranian cuisine
Middle Eastern cuisine
Levantine cuisine
Mediterranean cuisine